The fifth season of the fantasy drama television series Game of Thrones premiered on HBO on April 12, and concluded on June 14, 2015. It was broadcast on Sunday at 9:00 pm in the United States, consisting of 10 episodes, each running approximately 50–60 minutes. The season primarily adapts the storylines from A Feast for Crows and A Dance with Dragons, the fourth and fifth novels in George R. R. Martin's A Song of Ice and Fire series, though it also uses the remaining elements from the third novel, A Storm of Swords, as well as the upcoming sixth novel The Winds of Winter. It also contains original content not found in Martin's novels. The series is adapted for television by David Benioff and D. B. Weiss.

Like previous seasons in Game of Thrones, the fifth season continues storylines primarily set within the fictional land of Westeros, while a few storylines are set in another continent, Essos. After the murders of King Joffrey and his grandfather Tywin Lannister, Cersei Lannister’s young, indecisive son, Tommen, rules Westeros as king. Tyrion flees to Essos, where he meets Daenerys Targaryen, who struggles to rule Slavers' Bay and regain control over her growing dragons. The Lannister family encounters new enemies, including a religious cult that Cersei foolishly empowers; they arrest her and Queen Margaery; Cersei confesses some sins and is released after a walk of atonement. Jon Snow becomes Lord Commander of the Night's Watch and serves under Stannis Baratheon, who pursues his claim to the Iron Throne by marching on the rebuilt Winterfell. Littlefinger has left Sansa Stark at Winterfell; she marries Ramsay Bolton, who rapes and imprisons her. Stannis is defeated and killed, while Sansa makes an escape with Theon. After Jon loses Night's Watchmen trying to rescue thousands of Wildlings from the White Walkers, several of his men mutiny and kill him. In Braavos, Arya Stark receives training as an assassin but disobeys her trainers, who blind her. Jaime retrieves princess Myrcella from Dorne, but she is murdered.

HBO ordered the fifth season on April 8, 2014, together with the sixth season, which began filming in July 2014. The season was filmed primarily in Ireland, Northern Ireland, Croatia and Spain.

Game of Thrones features a large ensemble cast, including Peter Dinklage, Nikolaj Coster-Waldau, Lena Headey, Emilia Clarke and Kit Harington. The season introduced a number of new cast members, including Jonathan Pryce and Alexander Siddig.

Critics praised the show's production values and cast, giving specific accolades for Dinklage's portrayal of Tyrion Lannister. Viewership yet again rose compared to the previous season. This season set a Guinness World Record for winning the highest number of Emmy Awards for a series in a single season and year, winning 12 out of 24 nominations, including Outstanding Drama Series.

Episodes

Cast

Main cast

 Peter Dinklage as Tyrion Lannister
 Nikolaj Coster-Waldau as Jaime Lannister
 Lena Headey as Cersei Lannister
 Emilia Clarke as Daenerys Targaryen
 Kit Harington as Jon Snow
 Aidan Gillen as Petyr "Littlefinger" Baelish
 Charles Dance as Tywin Lannister
 Natalie Dormer as Margaery Tyrell
 Stephen Dillane as Stannis Baratheon
 Liam Cunningham as Davos Seaworth
 Carice van Houten as Melisandre
 John Bradley as Samwell Tarly
 Sophie Turner as Sansa Stark
 Kristofer Hivju as Tormund Giantsbane

 Hannah Murray as Gilly
 Conleth Hill as Varys
 Gwendoline Christie as Brienne of Tarth
 Michiel Huisman as Daario Naharis
 Nathalie Emmanuel as Missandei
 Dean-Charles Chapman as Tommen Baratheon
 Indira Varma as Ellaria Sand
 Maisie Williams as Arya Stark
 Jerome Flynn as Bronn
 Tom Wlaschiha as Jaqen H'ghar
 Alfie Allen as Theon Greyjoy / "Reek"
 Michael McElhatton as Roose Bolton
 Iwan Rheon as Ramsay Bolton
 Iain Glen as Jorah Mormont

Guest cast
The recurring actors listed here are those who appeared in season 5. They are listed by the region in which they first appear:

At and beyond the Wall
 Peter Vaughan as Maester Aemon
 Owen Teale as Alliser Thorne
 Brian Fortune as Othell Yarwyck
 Michael Condron as Bowen Marsh
 Dominic Carter as Janos Slynt
 Ben Crompton as Eddison Tollett
 J. J. Murphy as Denys Mallister
 Will O'Connell as Todder
 Brenock O'Connor as Olly
 Ciarán Hinds as Mance Rayder
 Birgitte Hjort Sørensen as Karsi
 Zahary Baharov as Loboda
 Ross O'Hennessy as the Lord of Bones
 Murray McArthur as Dim Dalba
 Ian Whyte as Wun Wun
 Ali Lyons as Johnna
 Richard Brake as the Night King

In the North
 Elizabeth Webster as Walda Bolton
 Tara Fitzgerald as Selyse Florent
 Kerry Ingram as Shireen Baratheon
 Charlotte Hope as Myranda

In the Vale
 Lino Facioli as Robin Arryn
 Rupert Vansittart as Yohn Royce
 Daniel Portman as Podrick Payne

In Dorne
 Alexander Siddig as Doran Martell
 Toby Sebastian as Trystane Martell
 Keisha Castle-Hughes as Obara Sand
 Rosabell Laurenti Sellers as Tyene Sand
 Jessica Henwick as Nymeria Sand
 Nell Tiger Free as Myrcella Baratheon
 DeObia Oparei as Areo Hotah

In King's Landing
 Julian Glover as Grand Maester Pycelle
 Anton Lesser as Qyburn
 Ian Gelder as Kevan Lannister
 Roger Ashton-Griffiths as Mace Tyrell
 Finn Jones as Loras Tyrell
 Diana Rigg as Olenna Tyrell
 Eugene Simon as Lancel Lannister
 Ian Beattie as Meryn Trant
 Hafþór Júlíus Björnsson as Gregor Clegane
 Paul Bentley as the High Septon
 Jonathan Pryce as the High Sparrow
 Hannah Waddingham as Septa Unella
 Will Tudor as Olyvar
 Josephine Gillan as Marei

In Braavos
 Mark Gatiss as Tycho Nestoris
 Gary Oliver as Ternesio Terys
 Oengus MacNamara as the thin man
 Faye Marsay as the Waif
 Sarine Sofair as Lhara
 Hattie Gotobed as Ghita

In Slaver's Bay
 Ian McElhinney as Barristan Selmy
 Jacob Anderson as Grey Worm
 Reece Noi as Mossador
 Joel Fry as Hizdahr zo Loraq
 Enzo Cilenti as Yezzan zo Qaggaz
 Adewale Akinnuoye-Agbaje as Malko
 Meena Rayann as Vala

Production

Crew

The writing staff for the fifth season includes executive producers and showrunners David Benioff and D. B. Weiss, producer Bryan Cogman, and Dave Hill, who was promoted to staff writer this season after previously working as an assistant to Benioff and Weiss. Author George R. R. Martin, who had written one episode for each of the first four seasons, did not write an episode for the fifth season as he was working to finish writing the sixth novel of the series, The Winds of Winter. The directing staff for the fifth season is Michael Slovis (episodes 1 and 2), Mark Mylod (episodes 3 and 4), Jeremy Podeswa (episodes 5 and 6), Miguel Sapochnik (episodes 7 and 8), and David Nutter (episodes 9 and 10). Nutter is the only returning director with the rest being first-time Game of Thrones directors.

Writing
This season features more original material than previous seasons. The deviations from Martin's novels are in part attributable to the way the television series has covered most of the novel series' published material and in part to the directors' opinions of the actors' abilities. For example, Sansa Stark arrives at Winterfell to marry Ramsay Bolton in "High Sparrow," a plotline that had been given to a minor character in the novels. In an interview, show writer David Benioff explains that Sophie Turner's development as an actress was one of the reasons that they decided to give her character more dramatic scenes, saying, "Even if [child actors] come in and do a great audition, it’s so hard to know if they’re going to quite literally grow into the parts. With Sansa and Arya in particular, their storylines have become quite dark. It was such a gamble and the fact that they’ve both become such great wonderful actresses is a bit of a miracle." Bryan Cogman added that it made more sense to give the Winterfell storyline to a proven actress who was already popular with viewers than to bring in a new character.

Other changes include the portrayal of Tommen as old enough to interact with Margaery and the Faith Militant as an adult, the speeding up or streamlining of several subplots, and the introduction of fewer new characters. According to Benioff and Weiss, "We felt we'd capsize the show if we put in every single character from the books." Critics particularly liked the decision to have Tyrion actually meet Daenerys at the end of "The Gift," which has yet to happen as of A Dance with Dragons. David Benioff cited the television adaptation's faster pace as part of the rationale behind this decision.

Filming

Filming for the fifth season began in July 2014 in Belfast and ended in December 2014. Locations in Northern Ireland included Titanic Studios, Belfast and the cliff edge of Binevenagh Mountain. The Winterfell sets were in the village of Moneyglass.

Some of the scenes that take place in the principality of Dorne were filmed in Spain, beginning in October 2014. Locations explored for the production included the Alcázar of Seville and the University of Osuna. On October 14, some scenes were filmed on the Roman bridge of Córdoba. Benioff and Weiss said that season 5 would include flashbacks, which they had previously avoided, and that Córdoba would represent the city of Volantis.

Cersei's "walk of atonement" from A Dance with Dragons was filmed in Dubrovnik, Croatia, in the Stradun street between the Dubrovnik Cathedral and the Sponza Palace in early October 2014. The production reportedly employed a body double for Lena Headey for part of the scene in which Cersei appears naked.
Meereen scenes were once again shot in Diocletian's Palace in Split, and on Klis Fortress north of Split.

A town on the coast of the Bay of Kaštela in Croatia, the 16th century Kaštel Gomilica stood in for some parts of Braavos.

A very small portion of one episode was filmed in Calgary, Alberta, Canada: the scenes featuring Jon Snow's wolf Ghost (played by animal actor Quigly) who also appears in season 6.

Casting

The fifth season adds previously recurring actors Indira Varma (Ellaria Sand), Michiel Huisman (Daario Naharis), Nathalie Emmanuel (Missandei), Dean-Charles Chapman (Tommen Baratheon), Tom Wlaschiha (Jaqen H'ghar) and Michael McElhatton (Roose Bolton) to the series' main cast.

In the fifth season, the region of Dorne is introduced as a location. Alexander Siddig joins the cast as Doran Martell, the ruling Prince of Dorne, and elder brother of Oberyn Martell, while his son Trystane Martell is portrayed by Toby Sebastian. The role of Cersei's daughter Myrcella Baratheon, who is Doran's ward and betrothed to Trystane is played by Nell Tiger Free. The role was portrayed by Aimee Richardson in the first two seasons. DeObia Oparei portrays Areo Hotah, the captain of the Dornish palace guard. The three eldest bastard daughters of Oberyn Martell (collectively known as the "Sand Snakes") are portrayed by Keisha Castle-Hughes (Obara Sand), Jessica Henwick (Nymeria Sand), and Rosabell Laurenti Sellers (Tyene Sand).

In King's Landing, Jonathan Pryce joins the cast as the High Sparrow, the leader of the militant faithful in King's Landing, while Hannah Waddingham portrays Septa Unella, one of the "Most Devout", the ruling council of the Faith of the Seven. Nell Williams  was cast as a young Cersei Lannister seen in flashbacks, while Jodhi May was cast as Maggy the Frog, a fortune-teller.

Across the Narrow Sea, Enzo Cilenti joins as Yezzan, a Yunkish nobleman and slave trader, while Adewale Akinnuoye-Agbaje was cast as Malko, a slaver, who does not appear in the novels. At Castle Black and beyond the Wall, new cast members include Michael Condron as Bowen Marsh, First Steward of the Night's Watch. J. J. Murphy, who was cast as Night's Watch officer Denys Mallister, died in August 2014 shortly after filming his first scenes; his role was not recast. One role that was recast for season 5 was Ross O'Hennessy as the Lord of Bones. O'Hennessy replaces Edward Dogliani who was last seen in the season 3 premiere "Valar Dohaeris". Charles Dance, whose character died in the previous season, returned for one episode to portray Tywin Lannister's corpse.  Isaac Hempstead-Wright (Bran Stark), Kristian Nairn (Hodor) and Ellie Kendrick (Meera Reed) are absent this season because their part in the story has reached the end of A Dance with Dragons.

Music

The soundtrack for the season was released digitally on June 9, 2015, and on CD on July 17, 2015.

Reception

Critical response

The fifth season was met with mostly positive reviews, though many deemed it to be weaker than its predecessors. On Metacritic, the season (based on the first four episodes) has a score of 91 out of 100 based on 29 reviews, indicating "universal acclaim". On Rotten Tomatoes, the fifth season has a 93% approval rating from 52 critics with an average rating of 8.61 out of 10. The site's critical consensus reads, "Bloody action and extreme power plays return full throttle, as Game of Thrones enjoys a new-found liberation from the world of the source material, resulting in more unexpected thrills." 

The Daily Telegraph stated in regards to the premiere episode, "Essentially, this was an exercise in scene setting, the chess pieces being laid out on the board." New York Daily News praised the season to have "little trouble keeping its pedal to the metal" due to its "cold-blooded characters treating personnel turnover as the natural order", when other shows "are starting to run out of gas by Season 5". Slant Magazine gave the season 3.5 out of 4 and stated, "There's plenty of death in the fifth season of the show, and it's understood as a cautionary symbol of power." Vanity Fair called this season "rich, satisfying and fantastically put together". Variety gave the season a positive review and stated, "Operating on a scale like nothing else on TV, and creatively liberated to play a long game stretching into the future, perhaps no project better distinguishes HBO's status as the leading premium player." IndieWire gave the season a score of 'B+' and found the "first few episodes skew dry, concerned largely with the establishment of allegiances", but still praised them for keeping the audiences "connected to those who have managed to survive thus far in the battle for power." 

The Boston Globe gave the season a positive review and stated, "The funny thing about Game of Thrones is that it's built on familiar genres and yet it appeals to those who may not be fans of those genres." James Poniewozik of Time gave the season a positive review and stated, "Game of Thrones is flying, full tilt, toward a destination off the edge of our map of the known world. I can't wait to see what it finds there." Salon.com gave the season a positive review and stated, "In the fifth season, the story has been distilled to just the moments of pathos and characterization and gorgeous direction that make the story work." Slate was concerned about the fact that the season "pulls even further away from the novels (the Sansa plot will drive some fans crazier than King Aerys)", though still thought it was "better for it".

The A.V. Club gave the season a score of 'A−' and stated, "Benioff and Weiss are making the same show but with slightly different rhythms, relying more on character shading and interplay than on staging the next massacre." Christopher Orr of The Atlantic found the season to be an improvement over the source material in terms of pace and focus. David Wiegand of the San Francisco Chronicle gave the season 4 out of 4 and eulogized the "greater sense of urgency", while The New York Times praised the "overall feeling of recharging and regeneration". Mary McNamara of the Los Angeles Times gave the season a positive review and stated, "Breathtaking, heartbreaking, awe-inspiring and addictive, it remains the single most remarkable feat of television, possibly ever, increasingly admirable for its ability to grow rather than simply sustain."

The only major publication to give the season a negative review was John Doyle of The Globe and Mail who stated, "A certain character says to someone who had been believed to be dangerous: "You're not terrifying, you're boring!" I'm with that character, all the way. Yes, everyone's a critic, Ms. Atwood."

The sixth episode, "Unbowed, Unbent, Unbroken" was heavily criticized due to the showrunners' decision to have a well-liked character suffer a sexual assault. It received a rating of 54% on Rotten Tomatoes, lower than any previous episode of the show. The eighth episode, "Hardhome", received significant praise and was immediately regarded as one of the best episodes in the series. According to Business Insider, "Despite the attacks, Game of Thrones remains a steady hit."

Season 5 featured more significant changes from the novels. Some of the changes were more well-received than others (the sexual assault scene was heavily criticized and caused great controversy). The various plotlines for the season also differed significantly in reception. The Dornish subplot received an overwhelmingly negative reception. In particular, the hyped Sand Snakes were maligned by critics and fans alike, as many found them cheesy and unlikeable. In contrast, Tyrion's storyline was highly praised. Many fans felt that his subplot progressed overly slowly in the novels, and his meeting with Daenerys was particularly lauded.

Ratings

The gross viewing figure per episode for the show, which include streaming, DVR recordings and repeat showings, averaged at 20 million this season.

 Live +7 ratings were not available, so Live +3 ratings have been used instead.

Business Insider noted a significant difference in the ratings between this season and previous seasons. The typical pattern involves "Solid premiere viewings followed by a slow but steady gain of momentum through to the finale. Historically, the finale episodes of each season have beaten the premiere for total number of viewers". However, this season showed a significant decline from 8 million viewers at the premiere to 5.4 million at the seventh episode, "The Gift". Business Insider cites two likely reasons for the lower ratings: backlash over the rape scene in "Unbowed, Unbent, Unbroken", one of many deviations from the novels throughout the season that "have upset fans," and increased online streaming through HBO Now. It also acknowledged a possible effect of the first four episodes leaking online before the season premiere and the decision to air on Memorial Day weekend in the United States (a weekend that had been skipped in previous seasons). Business Insider reached out to HBO for comment, HBO responded that it is seeing an increase in overall viewer numbers this season taking into account streaming services, which are not included in Nielsen ratings. The dip in ratings did not extend to the eighth and ninth episodes, "Hardhome," and "The Dance of Dragons", which were both seen by over 7 million viewers. The season finale, "Mother's Mercy" was seen by 8.11 million people, setting a new record and making it the most watched episode of the series.

Accolades

For the 5th Critics' Choice Television Awards, the series was nominated for Best Drama Series. For the 31st TCA Awards, the series was nominated for Program of the Year and Outstanding Achievement in Drama. For the 67th Primetime Emmy Awards, the series received 24 nominations, the most of any series. It won 12 awards, including Outstanding Drama Series, Peter Dinklage for Outstanding Supporting Actor in a Drama Series, Benioff and Weiss for Outstanding Writing for a Drama Series for "Mother's Mercy", and David Nutter for Outstanding Directing for a Drama Series for "Mother's Mercy". Nominations included Lena Headey and Emilia Clarke both for Outstanding Supporting Actress in a Drama Series, Diana Rigg for Outstanding Guest Actress in a Drama Series, and Jeremy Podeswa for Outstanding Directing for a Drama Series for "Unbowed, Unbent, Unbroken".

Release

Broadcast
The season was simulcast to 170 countries by HBO and its broadcast partners. In some countries, it aired the day after its first release. Sky Atlantic, the network serving the United Kingdom and Ireland, aired the premiere the day after HBO, but joined the simulcast for the rest of the season.

Marketing
A half-hour documentary, Game of Thrones: A Day in the Life, aired on HBO on February 8, 2015. It covered one day of production of season 5 on three sets in Belfast, Dubrovnik and Osuna from the viewpoint of key crew members. The first official trailer for season 5 was released on January 30, 2015, and the season's second trailer was released on March 9, 2015. The world premiere of the first episode of the fifth season was held at the Tower of London on March 18, 2015.

Home media
The season was released on Blu-ray and DVD on March 15, 2016, in region 1 and March 14, 2016, in region 2.

Illegal distribution
On April 11, prior to the airing of the season's first episode, screener copies of the first four episodes were leaked to several file sharing sites. According to TorrentFreak, 18 million different IP addresses downloaded the leaked episodes, totaling 32 million downloads during the first week. The fifth season of Game of Thrones was the most-pirated TV series in 2015.

References

External links
  – official US site
  – official UK site
 Game of Thrones – The Viewers Guide on HBO.com
 Making Game of Thrones on HBO.com
 
 

2015 American television seasons
Season 5